Sinnemahoning, also known as Sinnamahoning, is an unincorporated community in Cameron County, Pennsylvania, United States. Sinnemahoning has a post office with ZIP code 15861.

References

Unincorporated communities in Cameron County, Pennsylvania
Unincorporated communities in Pennsylvania